PalaGeorge is an indoor arena located in Montichiari, Italy, in the province of Brescia. The capacity of the arena is 5,500 people for basketball matches and it opened in 1993. It is home of the Brescia Leonessa team of the Lega Basket Serie A and the volleyball teams Promoball Flero (also known as Metalleghe Montichiari) and Millenium Brescia of the Italian Women's Volleyball League (Series A1 and A2 respectively).
It was also the home court of the Pallavolo Gabeca, the volleyball club of the city of Monza.

The arena is dedicated to Jimmy George, the Indian volleyball player who lost his life for a car accident in 1987.

In 2016 the arena hosted the 2015–16 CEV Women's Champions League Final Four in front of a crowd of 4,200 people.

References

Indoor arenas in Italy
Basketball venues in Italy
Volleyball venues in Italy
Sports venues in Lombardy
Buildings and structures in the Province of Brescia